State Route 18 (SR 18) is a state highway in the U.S. state of California. It serves as a primary route into the San Bernardino Mountains, both from the Riverside–San Bernardino metropolitan area from the south and the Mojave Desert from the north. SR 18 runs from State Route 210 in San Bernardino to State Route 138 in Llano. It has two discontinuities: one in Big Bear Lake, the other in Victorville.

Route description

The constructed portion of Route 18 begins at State Route 210 and quickly enters the San Bernardino Mountains as a four-lane expressway. SR 18 is known as Waterman Avenue in the city of San Bernardino before turning into SR 18. The route climbs north at a gentle grade until it turns east, where it begins to offer panoramic views of San Bernardino. Hence, this portion of Route 18 is known as the Rim of the World Highway. After meeting State Route 138 at Mount Anderson Junction south of Crestline, the expressway reverts to a two-lane mountain road. It meets two other highways, State Route 189 just east of Arrowhead Highlands and State Route 173 in Lake Arrowhead, before running over State Route 330 in Running Springs. SR 18 continues through several valleys and near ski resorts before reaching a summit. At that point, Route 18 again runs along a lengthy mountain ridge, offering more spectacular scenery at an even higher elevation. At its west junction with State Route 38 near the west corner of Big Bear Lake, Route 18 jogs across a dam and travels along the south shore of Big Bear Lake. After going through the City of Big Bear Lake, it overlaps with SR 38 and moves from the south to the north side of Bear Valley east of both Big Bear Lake and the Big Bear City airport before it descends from the mountains to the desert on the northerly side of the mountains, first heading northeast, briefly north, and then northwest.

SR 18 at this point follows the cities on the north face of the San Bernardino Mountains in the Mojave Desert: In Lucerne Valley, it turns west for 21 miles with SR 247 1/8th of a mile north of the bend.  It goes past the east terminus of Bear Valley Road (a major Victor Valley area cutoff) outside of Apple Valley town limits as it becomes an expressway (Happy Trails Highway, given for the High Desert's residency and final resting place of the legendary singing cowboy, Roy Rogers) through Apple Valley and Victorville. It joins with Interstate 15 inside of Victorville (this is considered a discontinuity, since the freeway entries refer to I-15 only and not State Route 18, which has partial route markings along the freeway, mainly on southbound I-15) for a few miles to the southeast and south before taking off west across the desert, reducing into a two-lane highway again outside of Victorville and meeting U.S. Route 395 in Adelanto, crosses into Los Angeles County as the beginning of county-named Pearblossom Highway and ending at State Route 138 east of Llano.

SR 18 thus takes an unusual path in the shape of a question mark.  On most of the signs of the highway, cardinal descriptions are not posted below the route markers, since it does not clearly go either west/east or north/south.  Also notable is that State Route 18 and 138 cover each other in opposing termini, as SR 138 ends at its southmost point in Crestline with SR 18, while SR 18's northwest most endpoint is in Llano with SR 138.

SR 18 is part of the California Freeway and Expressway System, and in Apple Valley and west of I-15 are part of the National Highway System, a network of highways that are considered essential to the country's economy, defense, and mobility by the Federal Highway Administration. SR 18 is eligible to be included in the State Scenic Highway System, but it is not officially designated as a scenic highway by the California Department of Transportation.

SR 18 from SR 138 at Crestline to SR 38 at the westernmost point of Big Bear Lake, and the SR 18/38 overlap in the City of Big Bear Lake, are designated as part of the Rim of the World Scenic Byway, a  National Forest Scenic Byway.

History
Much of SR 18 has been signed since 1917, with the portion north of Big Bear Lake dating from 1933. Since 1963, State Route 18 has generally been legislatively defined as from Interstate 10 to State Route 138 going through San Bernardino through Waterman Canyon and near Big Bear Lake and Victorville. However, the section from Interstate 10 to present-day State Route 210 was never built, although it was designated as Legislative Route 26 in 1916 and Legislative Route 275 in 1959. In 1944, prior to the construction of I-10, the southern terminus of SR 18 began at the intersection of E Street and Colton Avenue. It proceeded northward along E Street to Highland Avenue, turned eastward to Sierra Avenue, and northward into the foothills. In 1964, SR 18 was rerouted from the northern side of Big Bear Lake to the southern side along the former routing of SR 38 and lost its Legislative Route 43 designation. In 1984, the portion of SR 18 running concurrently with Interstate 15 in Victorville was removed from the legislative definition. In 1991, SR 18 was rerouted to Lakeview Drive and out of the downtown area of Big Bear Lake city proper, and this is now a business route of SR 18.

Before 1964, SR 18 continued south of San Bernardino to Lakewood, via La Cadena Drive, Magnolia Avenue, 6th Street, Pomona-Rincon Road, Santa Ana Canyon Road, Lincoln Avenue, Carson Street and Lakewood Boulevard.  When freeways were constructed, SR 18 was routed on what is now Interstate 215 and State Route 91 as well as Lakewood Boulevard. SR 18 then ran concurrently with State Route 19 to the western terminus of U.S. Route 6 in Long Beach.

Major intersections

See also

References

Further reading

External links

California @ AARoads - State Route 18
Caltrans: Route 18 highway conditions
Route 18 Live Web Cam in Big Bear Lake's Boulder Bay
California Highways: Route 18

018
State Route 018
State Route 018
San Bernardino Mountains
Mojave Desert
Transportation in San Bernardino, California
Victorville, California